Chris Houston is a Canadian punk rock musician and songwriter, who was in the band the Forgotten Rebels in the late 1970s. He co-wrote "Surfin' on Heroin", one of the band's most famous songs.

Following the band's album This Ain't Hollywood, he left to pursue a solo career. He recorded songs for four of the five It Came from Canada compilation albums, including a solo rendition of "Surfin' on Heroin". He released his solo debut Chris Houston and the Sex Machine domestically as a vinyl LP in 1986 on label Caucasian Records.  On cassette tape, he released Hate Filled Man in 1987 on Caucasian-Driveway Records.

He lived in Vancouver B.C. for a spell, working as a writer for the CBC Television teen series Pilot One, and now lives and performs in his hometown of Hamilton, Ontario.

See also

Music of Canada
Canadian punk rock
List of Canadian musicians

References
Citations

External links
Chris Houston recordings at Library and Archives Canada

Year of birth missing (living people)
Living people
Canadian punk rock singers
Canadian singer-songwriters
Musicians from Hamilton, Ontario